Drotaverine (INN, also known as drotaverin) is an antispasmodic drug, used to enhance cervical dilation during childbirth and to relieve smooth muscle spasms in gastrointestinal tract, urinary system, and gall bladder.

It is structurally related to papaverine, and is a selective inhibitor of phosphodiesterase-4, and has no anticholinergic effects.

It is available in Asia, India, Central and Eastern Europe (Poland, Hungary, Estonia, Latvia, Lithuania) under several brand names. Most known brand is No-Spa by Hungarian plant Chinoin (owned by Sanofi).

Pharmacodynamics 
Drotaverine hydrochloride has a spasmolytic, myotropic, vasodilation, hypotensive action.

Drotaverine decreases active ionized calcium supply binding to smooth muscle cells due to inhibition of phosphoesterase and cAMP intracellular accumulation of adenosine monophosphate. It has an apparent and prolonged action on smooth muscles of internal organs and blood vessels and it moderately decreases arterial blood pressure, increases cardiac output (minute volume of heart), and have some antiarrhythmic potential.

Drotaverine decreases vascular tone of cerebral blood vessels and increases blood-filling. Practically, Drotaverine does not influence the autonomic nervous system and does not penetrate into the central nervous system.

Side effects 
Possible side effects include: heating sensation, dizziness, headache (rarely), insomnia. May be observed: arrhythmia (rarely), hypotension, tachycardia, sweating, nausea.

Overdose of Drotaverine potentially can cause atrioventricular (AV) block, cardiac arrest, paralysis of respiratory system.

Counterfeits

In Israel the product is known under the brand name "No-Spa" by the general public which did not receive a permit to be distributed by the health ministry, however due to high demand local medical counterfeiters have managed to smuggle No-Spa tablets over the years.

In 2008, the Israeli health organization warned consumers against counterfeit No-SPA pills after a smuggler had been arrested at the Ben Gurion Airport with several thousand pills.

In 2011, Israeli patent and trademark office declined the use of the No-SPA.

Risks 
An article from 2013 described the effects from overdose (in a 19-year-old woman) as including vomiting, seizures and fatal cardiac toxicity.

In 2016, the young Russian chess player Ivan Bukavshin died of a massive overdose (or poisoning) of the drug, which was initially thought to be a stroke; dose detected in his blood was 17 mg/kg.

References

Drugs acting on the gastrointestinal system and metabolism
Norsalsolinol ethers
Antispasmodics
PDE4 inhibitors
Sanofi